Thomas Pearsall Field Hoving (January 15, 1931 – December 10, 2009) was an American museum executive and consultant and the director of the Metropolitan Museum of Art.

Early life
He was born in New York City to Walter Hoving, the head of Tiffany & Company, and his wife, Mary Osgood Field, a descendant of Samuel Osgood.  Hoving grew up surrounded by New York's upper social strata. As recounted in his memoir, Making the Mummies Dance, these early experiences would be invaluable in his later dealings with the Met's donors and trustees.

After schooling at Manhattan's Buckley School, Eaglebrook School in Massachusetts and a brief stint at Exeter, Hoving graduated from the Hotchkiss School in 1949. He received a B.A. in 1953, an M.F.A. in 1958, and a Ph.D. in 1959, all from Princeton University.

Career
As an undergraduate he majored in art and archaeology and supplemented his studies with regular trips to New York City to draw at the Art Students League.  He went to work for the Met in 1959, serving on the staff of the medieval department at The Cloisters until 1965, when he became curator of the department.

He left the Met in 1966 to become New York mayor John V. Lindsay's parks commissioner, but in 1967 returned to the Met as director after the incumbent, James J. Rorimer, died suddenly on March 11, 1966.  He assumed the directorship on March 17, 1967, and presided over a massive expansion and renovation of the museum, adding many important collections to its holdings.

Career at the Metropolitan Museum of Art
 His tenure at the Metropolitan Museum of Art was characterized by his distinctive approach to expanding the Met's collections. Rather than build more comprehensive holdings of relatively modest works, he pursued a smaller number of what he termed "world-class" pieces, including the Euphronios Krater depicting the death of Sarpedon (returned to Italy in 2008), Velázquez's Portrait of Juan de Pareja, and the Temple of Dendur.

The expansion of the Met during Hoving's directorship was not confined to its collections. Hoving also spearheaded a number of building projects and renovations of the Met itself, from a controversial expansion of its galleries into Central Park to the construction of its underground parking garage.

Two of the building's most characteristic features—the huge exterior banners announcing current shows, and the broad plaza and steps leading from Fifth Avenue to the Met's entryway—are products of Hoving's tenure. At one point, he even floated a plan to remove the Met's "great staircase" leading from the central lobby to the second-floor galleries. That particular project remains unrealized.

Hoving described the negotiations between the Metropolitan Museum, the Cairo Museum, Egypt's Organization of Antiquities, and the U.S. State Department to bring the exhibition The Treasures of Tutankhamun to the Met as "the high point of my Metropolitan career." The exhibition was the result of years of negotiations, including plans for a variety of cross-cultural collaborations, galvanized by President Richard M. Nixon's June 1974 trip to Egypt and finalized in an accord signed by Secretary of State Henry A. Kissinger and Foreign Minister Ismail Fahmi in October 1975. In July 1976, Hoving visited Egypt to negotiate terms of the traveling exhibition and finalize details of the Museum's collaboration with officials there.

Hoving was the director of the controversial "Harlem On My Mind" exhibit, curated by Allon Schoener, which garnered significant protests from local activists and artists for its exclusion of black artists, as well as for the inclusion of an anti-Semitic essay in the catalogue. Hoving apologized and included disclaimers before the essay in the catalogue, but did not remove it.

In his memoirs he revealed 2009 that Leonardo da Vincis masterpiece Mona Lisa was sprinkled for several hours inside the Metropolitan Museum.

Later career
He left the Met on June 30, 1977, to start an independent consulting firm for museums, Hoving Associates. From 1978 to 1984 he was an arts correspondent for the ABC newsmagazine 20/20. In 1978, he published Tutankhamun. The Untold Story, a non-fiction book about the discovery of the Egyptian tomb, with particular attention to its discoverer, Howard Carter. He edited Connoisseur Magazine from 1981 to 1991; along with his memoirs of his time at the Met, he is also the author of books on a number of art-related subjects, including art forgeries, Grant Wood, Andrew Wyeth, Tutankhamen, and the 12th-century walrus ivory crucifix known as the Bury St. Edmunds Cross. Additionally, in 1999, he wrote the text for the Art For Dummies book in the "...For Dummies" series.

Personal life
In 1953, Hoving was married to Nancy Bell, a Vassar College graduate whom he met at a house party in Princeton.  She was the daughter of Elliott V. Bell (1902–1983), a writer for The New York Times who managed the two successful gubernatorial campaigns for his friend, Thomas E. Dewey.  Together, they were the parents of a daughter, Petrea "Trea" Hoving.

Hoving died of lung cancer at his home in Manhattan, New York City, on December 10, 2009.

In popular culture
Hoving appeared in Who the *$&% Is Jackson Pollock?, a 2006 documentary by Harry Moses about a supposed "lost" Jackson Pollock painting, where he dismissed the claims, believing that true connoisseurs are the only ones who can identify the real from fake paintings and that fingerprints and forensic evidence are secondary. The clincher, he stated, was that the 'Pollock' painting had a gesso ground, something that Pollock never used. 

He was the subject of the titular profile in A Roomful of Hovings and Other Profiles, a 1969 collection of biographical pieces by John McPhee.

Works
 
 
 
 
 Hoving, Thomas. King of the Confessors: A New Appraisal. cybereditions.com: Christchurch, NZ, 2001.
 Hoving, Thomas. King of the Confessors. Simon & Schuster: New York, 1981.
 Artful Tom, A memoir // Artnet

Bibliography
 
 "Outdoorsman of the Big City", Life, April 29, 1966.

References

External links
 "Tom Hoving" (obituary), The Daily Telegraph (London, UK), Friday 11 December 2009.
 Thomas Hoving records at the Metropolitan Museum of Art Archives.

1931 births
2009 deaths
American art curators
Deaths from lung cancer in New York (state)
Directors of the Metropolitan Museum of Art
People from Manhattan
Hotchkiss School alumni
Princeton University alumni
New York City Department of Parks and Recreation
Buckley School (New York City) alumni